Hamid Rahimi is a boxer from Afghanistan. He is an ethnic Hazara who lives in Germany. In February 2012, he won the New World Boxing Union (WBU) Championship by defeating his Belarusian rival in Hamburg.

He also holds dual German citizenship. He left Germany and arrived at Kabul on 4 March 2011, where he met the Afghan National Olympic Committee.

Early life and career
Hamid Rahimi was born in September 12, 1983 into an ethnic Hazara family in Kabul, Afghanistan.

First professional boxing match in Afghanistan
At 30 October 2012 the first professional boxing match in Afghanistan was held in Kabul. The match was against Said Mbelwa from Tanzania for the WBO Intercontinental Middleweight Title. It ended in the 7th round when Mbelwa quit because of a shoulder injury. The match was broadcast on Afghanistan's national television. After winning the match, during a press conference Rahimi stated that he dedicated the award to the people of Afghanistan.

| style="text-align:center;" colspan="8"|21 Wins (10 knockouts, 11 decisions),  1 Loss (0 knockouts, 1 decision), 0 Draws
|-  style="text-align:center; background:#e3e3e3;"
|  style="border-style:none none solid solid; "|Res.
|  style="border-style:none none solid solid; "|Record
|  style="border-style:none none solid solid; "|Opponent
|  style="border-style:none none solid solid; "|Type
|  style="border-style:none none solid solid; "|Rd., Time
|  style="border-style:none none solid solid; "|Date
|  style="border-style:none none solid solid; "|Location
|  style="border-style:none none solid solid; "|Notes
|- align=center
|Win
|align=center|23–1||align=left| Bronislav Kubin
|
|
|
|align=left|
|align=left|
|- align=center
|- align=center
|Win
|align=center|22–1||align=left| Aliaksei Volchan
|
|
|
|align=left|
|align=left|
|- align=center
|Win
|align=center|21–1||align=left| Said Mbelwa
|
|
|
|align=left|
|align=left|
|- align=center
|Win
|align=center|20–1||align=left| Ruslan Rodivich
|
|
|
|align=left|
|align=left|
|- align=center
|Win
|align=center|19–1||align=left| Turgay Uzun
|
|
|
|align=left|
|align=left|
|- align=center
|Win
|align=center|18–1||align=left| Attila Kiss
|
|
|
|align=left|
|align=left|
|- align=center
|Win
|align=center|17–1||align=left| Bekay Elson
|
|
|
|align=left|
|align=left|
|- align=center
|Loss
|align=center|16–1||align=left| Attila Kiss
|
|
|
|align=left|
|align=left|
|- align=center
|Win
|align=center|16–0||align=left| Armen Azizian
|
|
|
|align=left|
|align=left|
|- align=center
|Win
|align=center|15–0||align=left| Andy Thiele
|
|
|
|align=left|
|align=left|
|- align=center
|Win
|align=center|14–0||align=left| Jozsef Siklodi
|
|
|
|align=left|
|align=left|
|- align=center
|Win
|align=center|13–0||align=left| Kamil Mitras
|
|
|
|align=left|
|align=left|
|- align=center
|Win
|align=center|12–0||align=left| Karel Zdarsa
|
|
|
|align=left|
|align=left|
|- align=center
|Win
|align=center|11–0||align=left| Jevgenijs Kiseljovs
|
|
|
|align=left|
|align=left|
|- align=center
|Win
|align=center|10–0||align=left| Karim Allous
|
|
|
|align=left|
|align=left|
|- align=center
|Win
|align=center|9–0||align=left| Andreas Roeder
|
|
|
|align=left|
|align=left|
|- align=center
|Win
|align=center|8–0||align=left| Thomas Hengstberger
|
|
|
|align=left|
|align=left|
|- align=center
|Win
|align=center|7–0||align=left| Tahir Celic
|
|
|
|align=left|
|align=left|
|- align=center
|Win
|align=center|6–0||align=left| Yves Romainville
|
|
|
|align=left|
|align=left|
|- align=center
|Win
|align=center|5–0||align=left| Ihar Filonau
|
|
|
|align=left|
|align=left|
|- align=center
|Win
|align=center|4–0||align=left| Adam Gawlik
|
|
|
|align=left|
|align=left|
|- align=center
|Win
|align=center|3–0||align=left| Zsolt Botos
|
|
|
|align=left|
|align=left|
|- align=center
|Win
|align=center|2–0||align=left| Viorel Otava
|
|
|
|align=left|
|align=left|
|- align=center
|Win
|align=center|1–0||align=left| Slavomir Merva
|
|
|
|align=left|
|align=left|
|- align=center

See also
Hamid Jafari
Afghans in Germany

References

Afghan male boxers
Middleweight boxers
Afghan emigrants to Germany
German people of Hazara descent
Living people
Hazara sportspeople
1983 births
German male boxers
Naturalized citizens of Germany